Nationality words link to articles with information on the nation's poetry or literature (for instance, Irish or France).

Events
March 2 – Samuel Johnson and his former pupil David Garrick leave Lichfield to seek their fortunes in London.
English poet Richard Jago becomes curate of Snitterfield.

Works published

United Kingdom
 Henry Carey, The Musical Century, in One Hundred English Ballads, with Carey's musical settings
 Stephen Duck, The Vision, on the November 20 death of Queen Caroline
 Richard Glover, Leonidas, in nine books (expanded to 12 in 1770)
 Matthew Green, The Spleen, has been called his chief poem; with a preface by his friend Richard Glover (see also, "Deaths" below)
 Alexander Pope:
 Horace His Ode to Venus
 The Second Epistle of the Second Book of Horace, Imitated
 Letters of Mr. Alexander Pope, and Several of his Friends, the first authorized edition (see Letters of Mr Pope and Mr Pope's Literary Correspondence, both 1735)
 The First Epistle of the Second Book of Horace, Imitated
 The Works of Alexander Pope, Volumes 5 and 6, letters (see also Works 1717, 1735, 1736
 Allan Ramsay, co-author and editor, The Tea-Table Miscellany, a collection of Scots songs, in Scots and English, composed or amended by Ramsay and his friends, the last of four volumes, with the first volume published in 1724
 William Shenstone, Poems Upon Various Occasions, published anonymously; includes the earliest version of "The School-mistress", with 12 stanzas (expanded version in 28 stanzas published separately in 1742, the final version in 35 stanzas published in Volume 1 of Dodsley's Collection of Poems 1748)
 Jonathan Swift, Poems on Several Occasions
 John Wesley and Charles Wesley, A Collection of Psalms and Hymns

Other
 Ignacio de Luzán, Poética, work of criticism that gives classic rules in Spanish literary composition
 Prince Thammathibet, The Legend of Phra Malai (พระมาลัยคำหลวง, Phra Malai), Thai

Births
Death years link to the corresponding "[year] in poetry" article:
 January 3 – Heinrich Wilhelm von Gerstenberg (died 1823), German poet and critic
 February 3 – Elizabeth Graeme Fergusson (died 1801), Colonial American poet and sponsor of literary salons
 May 18 – Gottlob Burmann (died 1805), German poet and lipogrammatist
 Joseph Mather (died 1804), English file cutter and songwriter

Deaths
Birth years link to the corresponding "[year] in poetry" article:
 January 21 – Ignjat Đurđević (born 1675), Croatian poet and translator
 February 20 – Elizabeth Rowe, née Singer (born 1674) English novelist, playwright and poet (apoplexy)
 March 26 – Vakhtang VI of Kartli (born 1675), Kartli statesman, legislator, scholar, critic, translator and poet
 October 18 – Abel Evans (born 1679), English clergyman, academic and poet
 Matthew Green (born 1696); English poet (see Works above)

See also

 Poetry
 List of years in poetry
 List of years in literature
 18th century in poetry
 18th century in literature
 Augustan poetry
 Scriblerus Club

Notes

 "A Timeline of English Poetry" Web page of the Representative Poetry Online Web site, University of Toronto

18th-century poetry
Poetry